Street is the fifth solo (and seventh overall) studio album by German singer Nina Hagen released on July 23, 1991 by Mercury Records. The album is produced by Zeus B. Held with songs written mostly by Hagen. It features songs in both, English and German. Hagen also worked with Anthony Kiedis and John Frusciante of Red Hot Chili Peppers or with English dance music producer Adamski, with whom she later recorded the song "Get Your Body". After toning down her image with the release of her 1989 album Nina Hagen, she kept on making more downtempo songs, this time, with elements of hip hop. Three singles from the album were released, "In My World", "Berlin" and "Blumen Für Die Damen". Street also contains a cover version of the hit song "Good Vibrations" by The Beach Boys.

The cover of the album features Hagen wearing three different outfits designed by Jean Paul Gaultier and Vivienne Westwood, with her name written in a Walt Disney-logo-resembling font.

Track listing

Personnel

Nina Hagen – vocals, songwriter, arranging
Zeus B. Held – producer, keyboards, saxophone, programming
Billy Liesegang – guitar, bass
Dierk Hill – guitar, bass, programming
Ingo Vauk – guitar, bass, engineer
Joniece Jamison – guitar, bass
Adam Woods – drums, percussion
Luís Jardim – drums, percussion, programming
Cesare Marcher – drums, percussion
Nick Fisher – programming

P. P. Arnold – backing vocals
Madeline Bell – backing vocals
Be La Key – backing vocals
Eddé Muse – backing vocals
MC Shan – vocals on "Blumen für die Damen" and "Nina 4 President"
Nattie Williams – vocals on "Keep It Live"
Otis Hagen Chevalier – vocals on "Keep It Live"
Technical
Philip Bagenal – engineer
Charles Steel – engineer

References

External links

1991 albums
Nina Hagen albums
Mercury Records albums